Senator Mendez (or Méndez) may refer to:

Juan Mendez (politician) (born 1985), Arizona State Senate
Lionel Fernández Méndez (1915–1998), Senate of Puerto Rico
Manuel A. García Méndez (fl. 1920s–1930s), Senate of Puerto Rico
Olga A. Méndez (1925–2009), New York State Senate